Mumbai Calling is a British-Indian comedy series, starring Sanjeev Bhaskar, set in the fictional Teknobable call centre in Mumbai. The series was shot on location in India. The pilot first aired on ITV on 30 May 2007.  The first series aired on ABC1 (Australia) starting on 12 May 2009, and on ITV starting on 30 May 2009.

Plot
Kenny Gupta (Bhaskar), a British Indian accountant, is sent to a call centre in Mumbai by his boss, Philip Glass. His job is to turn it around and make it profitable. Kenny is joined by Glass' daughter, Tiffany (Sophie Hunter), and local call centre manager Dev Raja (Ganatra).

After the pilot episode, Series 1 featured some major changes including replacing the character Tiffany Glass to Terri Johnson (Beaumont), and the call centre itself looked much more modern.

Episodes
 Teknobable
 Home Comforts
 Good Sellers
 Boy to Man
 Dating Season
 My Mate Mumbai
 All That Glitters is Not Glass
These seven new episodes were originally scheduled to be broadcast in a prime-time slot in ITV's 2008 Winter Schedule, however the channel changed its mind and put the episodes "on the shelf". As a result, the new episodes were first seen on HBO India in 2008 and did not appear on UK screens until the end of May 2009.

See also
Outsourced, an American television sitcom with a similar premise.

References

External links

2007 British television series debuts
2009 British television series endings
2000s British sitcoms
2000s British workplace comedy television series
Australian Broadcasting Corporation original programming
British Indian mass media
ITV sitcoms
English-language television shows
Television shows set in Mumbai
Outsourcing in India